Dicentra uniflora, the longhorn steer's head, is a herbaceous perennial growing from a tuber, native to gravelly soils in mountains of the western United States.

Description
Leaves are leaves are long-stalked and 3-times compound with rounded leaflets. Each leaflet is deeply divided.

Flowers have pink to white petals tinged with light brown or purple. The two outer petals are bent back; the inner petals are fused at the tip. Flowers bloom February to June. Its habitats include open woods and foothills.

References

External links

Jepson Manual: Dicentra uniflora
Flora of North America — map
Dicentra uniflora - U.C. Photo Gallery

uniflora
Flora of California
Flora of Oregon
Flora of Nevada
Flora of Utah
Flora of the Northwestern United States
Flora of the Rocky Mountains
Flora of the Sierra Nevada (United States)
Flora without expected TNC conservation status